631 Philippina is a minor planet orbiting the Sun that was discovered by German astronomer August Kopff on March 21, 1907.

Photometric of this asteroid made in 1981 gave a light curve with a period of 5.92 ± 0.01 hours with a brightness variation of 0.20 in magnitude. In 2007 lightcurve data showed that it rotates every 5.899 ± 0.001 hours.

See also
List of minor planets: 1–1000

References

External links
 
 

Background asteroids
Philippina
Philippina
S-type asteroids (Tholen)
S-type asteroids (SMASS)
19070321